Apisa subcanescens is a species of moth of the  family Erebidae. It was described by Walter Rothschild in 1910. It is found in Eritrea, Senegal and Tanzania.

References

Moths described in 1910
Syntomini
Erebid moths of Africa